Dwayne Ambusley (born 10 August 1980) is a Jamaican international footballer who plays for Montego Bay United, as a midfielder.

Career

Club 
Ambusley has played for Rusea's High School, Legend FC, Mount Pelier and Montego Bay United. Ambusley also coached during his time at Montego Bay United

International 

He made his senior international debut for Jamaica in 2016.

References

1980 births
Living people
Jamaican footballers
Jamaica international footballers
Montego Bay United F.C. players
National Premier League players
Association football midfielders